1,000 Places to See in the US and Canada Before You Die (2007) is a book written by Patricia Schultz as a follow up book to 1,000 Places to See Before You Die.

The listing below is divided into sections like the book and each listing appears as it does in the book.  Places that are in more than one state are listed in each state.  When a location wasn't given in the book a descriptor has been added for ease of finding each place.  Some places do not exist as a comprehensive unit, such as New Haven Dining or The Lighthouse Trail in Maine, in these cases there is no information listed here, you can find the individual places listed in the book.  Businesses (food, lodging) that are mentioned in the text of each place are also not listed here.

The United States

New England

Connecticut 
 Connecticut's Art Trail, Statewide
 Connecticut's Seafood Institutions, Statewide
 Connecticut's Quiet Corner, Northeast corner of state
 Litchfield Hills, Northwestern corner of state
 Fairfield County
 Foxwoods & Mohegan Sun, New London County
 Connecticut's Gold Coast, Greenwich area
 Chester & East Haddam
 Mystic Seaport & Stonington
 Washington & New Preston
 Essex
 New Haven Dining
 The Mark Twain House and Museum, Hartford
 The Wadsworth Atheneum, Hartford (first public art museum in USA)
 Yale University, New Haven

Maine 
 The Lighthouse Trail, Coastal Maine
 Maine Canoe Country, Northern Maine
 Acadia National Park, Hancock and Knox Counties
 Mount Katahdin and Baxter State Park, Northeast Piscataquis County
 The Towns of Penobscot Bay
 The Kennebunks (Kennebunk, Kennebunkport, Kennebunk Beach)
 Blue Hill
 Ogunquit
 Monhegan Island
 Moosehead Lake
 Red's Eats, Wiscasset
 WoodenBoat School, Brooklin
 Sugarloaf, Carrabassett Valley
 L.L.Bean, Freeport
 Sabbathday Lake Shaker Village, New Gloucester
 The Farnsworth Art Museum, Rockland
 Maine Lobster Festival, Rockland
 Sailing the Maine Windjammers, Rockland, Camden, Rockport

Massachusetts 
 Cape Ann, Northeastern Massachusetts
 Cape Cod National Seashore, Cape Cod
 Brimfield and Sturbridge
 Lexington and Concord
 Lowell
 Martha's Vineyard
 Nantucket
 Provincetown
 Salem
 Beacon Hill, Boston
 Boston's North End, Boston
 Harvard Square, Cambridge
 The "Inland Newport"
 Along the Mohawk Trail
 The Freedom Trail, Boston
 Boston Harborfest, Boston
 The Boston Marathon, Boston
 Fenway Park, Boston
 Isabella Stewart Gardner Museum, Boston
 Museum of Fine Arts, Boston
 The Public Garden, Boston
 Hancock Shaker Village, Hancock
 Berkshire Summer Festivals
 Nirvana in the Berkshires
 MASS MoCA, North Adams
 Thanksgiving at Plimoth Plantation, Plymouth

New Hampshire, Rhode Island, Vermont

Mid-Atlantic

Delaware 
 Lewes
 New Castle
 The Du Pont Legacy, Wilmington
 Winterthur Museum, Winterthur

Maryland 
 Inner Harbor, Baltimore
 American Visionary Art Museum, Baltimore
 Oriole Park at Camden Yards, Baltimore
 Antietam Battlefield, Sharpsburg
 Obrycki's and Faidley's, Baltimore
 Annapolis
 Assateague Island
 Baltimore Museum of Art, Baltimore
 Crisfield and Smith and Tangier Islands, Crisfield
 Garrett County
  Talbot County
 The Horse Scene
 Historic St. Mary's

New Jersey 
 Duke Farms, Hillsborough
 Rutt's Hut, Clifton
 The Statue of Liberty & Ellis Island, near New York City in 2007 edition, it is not mentioned that part of Ellis Island is in New Jersey

New York 
Rhinebeck
 Cooperstown
 The Erie Canal
 Central Park, New York City
 The Empire State Building, New York City
 The Statue of Liberty & Ellis Island, near New York City
 Yankee Stadium, New York City
 Prospect Park & The Brooklyn Botanic Garden, New York City
 Buffalo Wings, Buffalo
 New York's Best Pizza, New York City

Pennsylvania 
 Hershey
 Valley Forge
 Pennsylvania Dutch Country, Lancaster, Berks, and adjacent counties
 The Franklin Institute Science Museum, Philadelphia
 Independence National Historical Park, Philadelphia
 Franklin Court & The Betsy Ross House, Philadelphia
 Gettysburg National Military Park
 Philly Food, Philadelphia
 D.G. Yuengling & Sons, Pottsville
 Roadside America, Shartlesville

Virginia 
 Blue Ridge Parkway, Central part of state
 The Eastern Shore & Chincoteague
 Shenandoah Valley, Western part of state
 Assateague Island
 Crisfield and Smith and Tangier Islands
 Manassas & Appomattox
 Jamestown & Yorktown
 Lexington
 Staunton
 Fredericksburg
 Historic Richmond
 Charlottesville
 Monticello, Charlottesville
 Old Town Alexandria
 James River Plantations, Charles City
 Mount Vernon
 Colonial Williamsburg
 Arlington National Cemetery
 Hunt Country, Northern Loudoun County
 The Homestead, Hot Springs
 The Inn at Little Washington, Washington
 Virginia Highlands Festival, Abindgdon
 The Crooked Road Music Heritage Trail, Southwestern part of state
 The Steven F. Udvar-Hazy Center, Chantilly

Washington D.C. 
 The White House
 The Supreme Court
 The United States Capitol
 The National Air and Space Museum
 Holocaust Museum
 The International Spy Museum & The Newseum (Newseum closed December 2019)
 The National Museum of American History
 The National Museum of Natural History
 The National Archives
 The National Mall

The Southeast

Alabama 
 Civil Rights Trail
 U.S. Space & Rocket Center, Huntsville
 Talladega Superspeedway, Talladega

Georgia 
 Dahlonega

North Carolina 
 North Carolina BBQ, Statewide
 The Biltmore, Asheville
 Wilmington
 Cape Fear Coast, Wilmington
 Pinehurst
 Seagrove
 The Fearrington House Inn, Pittsboro

South Carolina 
 The Heart of Charleston
 Lowcountry Cuisine

Mississippi Valley

Arkansas 
 Hot Springs
 The Crater of Diamonds, Pike County
 McClard's BAR-B-Q, Hot Springs

Kentucky, Louisiana

Mississippi 
 The Natchez Trace
 Vicksburg National Military Park
 Holy Springs
 Natchez

Missouri

Tennessee 
 Franklin

The Midwest

Illinois

Indiana 
 Parke County
 Shipshewana
 Columbus
 Madison
 Nashville and Story
 New Harmony
 Indiana Dunes National Lakeshore
 Indianapolis 500
 Yoder Popcorn Store, Topeka
 Wolf's Bar-B-Q, Evansville
 Bill Monroe Bluegrass Festival, Bean Blossom from 2007 edition, festival no longer held

Iowa 
 Amana Colonies,  Amana, East Amana, High Amana, Middle Amana, South Amana, West Amana, and Homestead
 Living History Farms, Urbandale

Michigan, Minnesota

Ohio 
 Ohio's Amish Country, Holmes County
 Holden Arboretum, Kirtland
 Pro Football Hall of Fame, Canton

Wisconsin

Great Plains

Idaho, Kansas, Montana

Nebraska 
 The Panhandle

North Dakota 
 Little Missouri National Grassland, Western part of state
 Theodore Roosevelt National Park, Western part of state

Oklahoma 
 Wichita Mountains Wildlife Refuge, Southwestern part of state
 Bartlesville
 Guthrie
 Cattlemen's Restaurant & Stockyards City, Oklahoma City
 National Cowboy & Western Heritage Museum, Oklahoma City
 Marland Estate Mansion, Ponca City
 Gilcrease Museum, Tulsa
 Red Earth Native American Cultural Festival

South Dakota 
 Badlands National Park, Southwestern part of state
 Custer State Park, Western part of state
 Mount Rushmore & Crazy Horse, Western part of state
 Laura Ingalls Wilder Country, DeSmet
 Deadwood
 Corn Palace, Mitchell
 The Black Hills Passion Play from 2007 edition, play retired
 Sturgis Motorcycle Rally, Sturgis
 Wall Drug Store, Wall

Wyoming 
 Bighorn Mountains & The Medicine Wheel, North Central part of state
 Bighorn River Canyon, Northern part of state
 Devils Tower, Northeastern part of state
 Wind River Country, West Central part of state
 Yellowstone, Northwestern part of state
 Grand Teton National Park, Moose
 Cody
 Jackson
 Saratoga
 Sheridan
 South Pass City
 Cheyenne Frontier Days, Cheyenne
 Bitterroot Dude Ranch, Dubois
 Amangani, Jackson
 Skiing Jackson Hole, Jackson Hole
 Wind River Country, Western part of state

Four Corners and The Southwest

Arizona 
 Navajo Reservation, Northeastern part of state
 Canyon de Chelly, Navajo Nation
 Grand Canyon, Northern part of state
 Lake Powell, Northern part of state
 Monument Valley, Northern part of state
 Hopi Reservation
 Cochise County
 Tucson and Tanque Verde
 Valley of the Sun, Phoenix and Scottsdale
 Sedona and Red Rock Country
 Prescott
 Flagstaff
 Wickenburg
 Tubac
 Canyon Ranch and Miraval, Tucson
 The Boulders, Carefree
 Heard Museum, Phoenix
 The Phoenician, Scottsdale
 Taliesin West, Scottsdale
 Enchantment Resort, Sedona

Colorado 
 Dinosaur National Monument, near Dinosaur

Nevada

New Mexico 
 Las Vegas
 Los Alamos
 Silver City
 Roswell
 Taos
 Aztec
 Gallup
 Navajo Reservation, Northwestern part of state
 Indian Pueblos of New Mexico, Statewide
 Route 66, Statewide
 Chaco Culture National Historical Park, Northwest part of state
 Carlsbad Caverns National Park, Carlsbad
 White Sands National Park, Holloman Air Force Base
 Taos Ski Valley, Taos Ski Valley
 Cumbres & Toltec Scenic Railroad, Chama
 Albuquerque International Balloon Fiesta, Albuquerque
 Georgia O'Keeffe Trail, Santa Fe and Abiquiu
 Santa Fe's Southwest Cuisine, Santa Fe
 Markets of Santa Fe, Santa Fe
 Santa Fe Opera, Santa Fe
 Hot Springs and Spas, Santa Fe and Northern part of state
 The Very Large Array & The Lightning Field, West central part of state

Texas

Utah 
 Arches National Park, Southeast part of state
 Navajo Reservation, Southeastern part of state
 Lake Powell, Southern part of state
 Monument Valley, Southern part of state
 Grand Staircase–Escalante National Monument, South Central part of state
 Canyonlands National Park, Garfield, Grand, San Juan, and Wayne Counties
 Dinosaur National Monument, near Jensen
 Capitol Reef National Park, Torrey
 Bryce Canyon National Park Bryce
 Zion National Park, Springdale
 Mexican Hat and Cedar Mesa
 Bluff & The San Juan River
 Moab and Red Rock Country
 St. George
 Sundance
 Alta and Snowbird, Little Cottonwood Canyon
 Park City Skiing, Park City
 Spiral Jetty, Rozell Point, Great Salt Lake
 Temple Square, Salt Lake City

West Coast

California 
 Pacific Coast Highway, Statewide
 Chez Panisse, Berkeley

Oregon 
 The Oregon Coast, Statewide
 Bend & Mount Bachelor
 Cannon Beach
 Astoria
 Oregon Country Fair, Veneta
 Jacksonville and The Britt Festival
 Oregon Brewers Festival, Portland
 Oregon Shakespeare Festival, Ashland
 Bandon Dunes Golf Resort, Bandon
 The Columbia River Gorge, Northern border of state
 Mount Hood, North central part of state
 The Rogue River, Southwestern part of state
 Willamette Valley, Western part of state
 Portland's Public Gardens, Portland
 Salishan Spa and Golf Resort, Gleneden Beach
 Pendleton Round-Up, Pendleton
 Steens Mountain & Malheur National Wildlife Refuge, Southeastern part of state
 Crater Lake National Park, Southeastern part of state
 John Day Fossil Beds National Monument, Northeastern part of state

Washington 
 The Columbia River Gorge, Southern border of state
 Bellingham & Mount Baker
 Semiahmoo Resort, Blaine
 La Conner & The Skagit Valley
 Leavenworth
 Long Beach Peninsula, Western border of state
 The Methow Valley
 Mount Rainier National Park & Mount St. Helens, Western part of state
 The Makah Museum, Neah Bay
 North Cascades National Park, Northwestern part of state
 Olympic National Park, Northwestern part of state
 Port Townsend
 The San Juan Islands, Northwestern part of state
 Pike Place Market, Seattle
 Seattle Center, Seattle
 Seattle's Coffee Culture
 Seattle's Seafood Restaurants
 Tillicum Village, Seattle
 Salish Lodge & Spa, Snoqualmie
 The Museum of Glass, Tacoma
 Walla Walla
 Whidbey Island
 Woodinville Wineries & The Herbfarm

Alaska and Hawaii

Alaska 
 The Arctic National Wildlife Refuge, Northeast corner
 Glacier Bay National Park, Gustavus area
 Denali, Central part of state
 Wrangell-St. Elias National Park, Southeastern corner
 Driving the Alaska Highway
 Sailing the Inside Passage
 The Kenai Peninsula & Prince William Sound
 Gates of the Arctic & Noatak, Northwestern part of state
 Kodiak Island & The Katmai Coast
 Downtown Sitka
 Nome
 The Pribilof Islands
 The Iditarod, Anchorage
 Helicopter Glacier Treks, Juneau
 Hiking the Chilkoot Trail, Skagway
 Heli-Skiing in the Chugach Mountains, Valdez
 The Northern Lights, Chena Hot Springs
 The Alyeska Resort, Girdwood

Hawaii 
 Hawaii Volcanoes National Park, Island of Hawai'i
 Diamond Head, Honolulu
 Pearl Harbor, Island of O'ahu
 Hilo Farmers Market, Hilo
 Merrie Monarch Hula Festival, Hilo

Canada

Eastern Canada
New Brunswick, Newfoundland and Labrador, Nova Scotia, Nunavut, Ontario, Prince Edward Island, Quebec

Western Canada
Alberta, British Columbia, Manitoba, Northwest Territories, Saskatchewan, The Yukon

See also
 Travel Channel
 1,000 Places to See Before You Die

External links 
 The Official Site of 1,000 Places To See Before You Die

2007 non-fiction books
Books about Canada
Books about the United States